"Good Enough" is a single released by English Britpop band Dodgy. The single was released on 29 July 1996 and was the band's highest-charting single, reaching number four in the United Kingdom. In 1997, the song charted in Canada, peaking at number 20 on the RPM Top Singles chart.

Track listings

UK CD single
 "Good Enough"
 "Speaking in Tongues"
 "Lovebirds on Katovit"

UK cassette and limited-edition 7-inch single
A. "Good Enough"
B. "Nutters"

Japanese CD single
 "Good Enough"
 "Speaking in Tongues"
 "Lovebirds on Katovit"
 "(Your Love Keeps Lifting Me) Higher and Higher"
 "The Snake"
 "I Can't Make It"

Charts

Weekly charts

Year-end charts

Certifications

References

1996 singles
1996 songs
A&M Records singles
Dodgy songs
Song recordings produced by Hugh Jones (producer)